General Meyer may refer to:

Adolph Meyer (1842–1908), Louisiana National Guard brigadier general
David J. Meyer (fl. 1980s–2020s), U.S. Air Force major general
Edward C. Meyer (1928–2021), U.S. Army general
John C. Meyer (1919–1975), U.S. Air Force general
Kurt Meyer (1910–1961), German Waffen-SS brigadier general
Len Meyer (fl. 1980s–1990s), South African Army lieutenant general
Lucas Johannes Meyer (1846–1902), South African Boer general
Monk Meyer (1913–2001), U.S. Army brigadier general

See also
Heinrich Meyer-Buerdorf (1888–1971), German Wehrmacht general
Hermann Meyer-Rabingen (1887–1961), German Wehrmacht lieutenant general
Claude Meier (born 1964), Swiss Air Force major general
Edelmiro Mayer (1834–1897), Argentine-born Mexican Army general
Johannes Mayer (1893–1963), German Wehrmacht general